Kim Gellard (born November 6, 1974) is a Canadian curler from Unionville, Ontario.

At a Toronto high school curling competition, Gellard skipped a team that scored back-to-back eight-enders. An eight ender is scoring eight points (with all eight rocks) in an end is extremely rare in its own right.

Awards
 All-Star Team:

Personal life
Gellard is a graduate of Markham District High School. Her uncle is fellow curler Paul Savage. Her mother Mary ( Savage)  was her coach at the 1996 World Juniors. Her father Sam played professional ice hockey in the World Hockey Association. Her grandfather played professional soccer in England and served in the British Army during World War II. Gellard attended the University of Western Ontario.

Teams and events

References

External links
 
 Kim Gellard - Curling Canada Stats Archive
 Corie Beveridge ; Lisa Rowsell; Kim Gellard and Debbie Green win big. News Photo - Getty Images

Living people
Canadian women curlers
Curlers from Ontario
World curling champions
Canadian women's curling champions
1974 births
Sportspeople from Markham, Ontario
University of Western Ontario alumni